Eliza Brown (1811 – 24 April 1896) was an early settler in colonial Western Australia whose letters to her father record the hardships of her family.  She accompanied an exploration to Champion Bay in 1851, her account of the journey being published.

Early years
Eliza was the daughter of William Bussey of Cuddesdon, South Oxfordshire, a "gentleman of considerable means".

When Eliza was 13, her mother was committed to an asylum for the insane after she had attempted to take the life of a friend. "She attempted this by leaving the room and returning with an axe".

In 1836, she married Thomas Brown, who was a road surveyor. A son Kenneth was born on 19 August 1837 and Vernon was born in 1839.

Emigration 
Thomas Brown disclosed the reason why the couple considered emigrating in a letter to William Bussey in 1850:

The Browns obtained advice from friends Samuel Waterman Viveash and William Tanner, who had already settled in Western Australia.

In November 1840, the Browns left England to emigrate to Western Australia.  They travelled in a steerage cabin on the Sterling with 14 other emigrants. They brought with them seven servantsEliza started writing letters to her father during the voyage. 

Shortly after leaving, as Eliza wrote to her father:

They arrived in Western Australia in March 1841.

Grass Dale 
The Browns purchased from Revett Henry Bland a farm called Grass Dale, near York.

A son Aubrey was born in 1841 at York.  Eliza wrote to her father about this:

Quoting historian Geoffrey Bolton:

In September 1842, life may have become a little more comfortable as Thomas  leased a farm house and other farm buildings from a neighbour Mr John Wall Hardey.

In 1843, Maitland was born.  

There was a depression in Western Australia and they struggled financially.  “Costs remained high, but the price of stock fell.” They were indebted to Eliza's father who had loaned them money or guaranteed loans.  Thomas had to resort to cutting sandalwood to earn a living.  

On 15 December 1844, their son, Vernon, drowned in the River Avon.  Another son was born in 1845, and named Vernon. and Matilda was born on 25 November 1847.

Eliza writes about this to her father as follows:

Not long after they moved into their new home at Grass Dale in 1845, the home was struck by lightning:

On one occasion in 1848, her son Kenneth was accidentally speared. In another incident: 

Education was a problem for Eliza, she wrote:

Champion Bay 
In 1850, her husband joined a party exploring the Champion Bay district. He selected 40,000 acres (160 km2) on the Greenough River, and the following year established a homestead there, which he called Glengarry.  Eliza was left to manage the farm at York.

A daughter Janet was born in 1850.

In May and June 1851, Eliza herself rode with her husband and others to Champion Bay, and was persuaded by the Governor to write her account of the journey, which was published in the Inquirer. She explained to her father why she joined the journey to Champion Bay:

Fremantle 
The Browns did not move to Champion Bay because in May 1851, the Governor appointed Thomas as a Member of the Western Australian Legislative Council and they moved to Perth.  In October 1851, Brown was appointed acting Police Magistrate in Fremantle, during the absence of Thomas Yule. Brown accepted the position and he and Eliza and family moved to Fremantle. Grass Dale was let.
He was appointed Resident Magistrate for Fremantle the following year, and from 1856 was also Perth's Collector of Customs.

Later years
Eliza returned to England in 1859 to see her father before he died, taking Aubrey with her.
In October 1862, Thomas Brown was transferred to the position of Resident Magistrate at Geraldton. He held the position until his death the following June.

In 1876, she gave evidence in the case involving her son Kenneth who had been charged with murder after shooting his second wife.  The defence tried to show he was insane and Eliza gave evidence of the insanity of her mother.

She died on 24 April 1896.

Edith Cowan was her granddaughter.

Letters 
Eliza's legacy is her letters to her father.  These “form a valuable addition to early accounts of the Swan River Colony, describing it in its second decade of existence.” 
The letters begin aboard ship in 1840 and cease in 1852.

The letters were edited for the book "A Faithful Picture" by the Browns' great-grandson and writer, Peter Cowan.

Notes

References

Explorers of Western Australia
Settlers of Western Australia
1811 births
1896 deaths
19th-century Australian writers